Mettmach is a municipality in the district of Ried im Innkreis in the Austrian state of Upper Austria. It is best known as the home of  Anton Reinthaller.

Population

References

Cities and towns in Ried im Innkreis District